EDMA is a psychoactive drug and a substituted amphetamine

EDMA may also refer to:

 Augsburg Airport (ICAO code EDMA)
 Edma, a village in Ustyansky District, Arkhangelsk Oblast, Russia
 Encyclopédie Du Monde Actuel (The Encyclopedia of the Current World –EDMA)